San Phak Wan is a tambon (subdistrict) of Hang Dong District, in Chiang Mai Province, Thailand. In 2016 it had a population of 14,557 people.

Administration

Central administration
The tambon is divided into seven administrative villages (mubans).

Local administration
The area of the subdistrict is covered by the subdistrict municipality (thesaban tambon) San Phak Wan (เทศบาลตำบลสันผักหวาน).

References

External links
Thaitambon.com on San Phak Wan
 Google map with boundaries of San Phak Wan

Tambon of Chiang Mai province
Populated places in Chiang Mai province